Poet's Pub is a 1929 comedy novel by the British writer Eric Linklater. An aspiring poet is hired by his friend's mother to run a large inn she has acquired. In 1935 it was one of the original ten Penguin Paperbacks to be published.

Adaptation
In 1949 it was adapted into a film of the same title directed by Frederick Wilson and starring Derek Bond, Rona Anderson and James Robertson Justice.

References

Bibliography
 Goble, Alan. The Complete Index to Literary Sources in Film. Walter de Gruyter, 1999.
 Hart, Francis Russell.  The Scottish Novel: From Smollett to Spark. Harvard University Press, 1978.

1929 British novels
Novels by Eric Linklater
Novels set in England
British novels adapted into films
British comedy novels
Jonathan Cape books